Norbert Leo Butz (born January 30, 1967) is an American actor and singer. He is best known for his work in Broadway theatre. He is a two-time winner of the Tony Award for Best Actor in a Musical, and is one of only nine actors ever to have won the award twice.

Early and personal life
Butz was born on January 30, 1967, in St. Louis, Missouri, the son of Elaine (née Bourisaw) and Norbert Butz. He was raised in a middle-class family; his parents are devout Catholics. He is the seventh of 11 children and is named after his father. Some of his first theatre roles included playing the male leads at local all-girl high schools, such as Cor Jesu Academy and Nerinx Hall. He graduated from Bishop DuBourg High School. Butz earned a Bachelor of Fine Arts from The Conservatory of Theatre Arts at Webster University and a Master of Fine Arts from The University of Alabama/Alabama Shakespeare Festival's Professional Actor Training Program. He would later receive an honorary degree from Webster University in 2013.

The murder of his sister, Teresa Butz, made national news when an assailant stabbed both her and her girlfriend in her Seattle-area home on July 19, 2009.

Butz's daughter Georgia Teresa was born on January 2, 2011. Butz has two older daughters, Clara and Maggie Davis, from a previous marriage.

Career
Butz made his Broadway debut as a replacement swing – a type of understudy – in Rent in 1996, after original swing David Driver was let go. Butz ultimately replaced Adam Pascal as Roger in 1997. Additional Broadway credits include Thou Shalt Not (Camille Raquin, 2001–2002), for which he received a Tony Award nomination; Wicked (the original Fiyero, 2003); and Dirty Rotten Scoundrels (Freddy) for which he received the Tony Award for Best Leading Actor in a Musical, the Drama Desk Award for Outstanding Actor in a Musical, a Drama League Award, and an Outer Critics Circle Award. His Off-Broadway credits include The Last Five Years (Jamie), Saved (Fred), and Juno and the Paycock (Jerry Devine), and he has toured as the Emcee in Cabaret and as Freddy in Dirty Rotten Scoundrels.

Butz's film roles have included Went to Coney Island on a Mission from God... Be Back by Five (Pawnbroker), Noon Blue Apples (Howard Philips), and West of Here (Josiah Blackwell).

Butz's projects include the film Dan in Real Life (with Steve Carell, Juliette Binoche, and Dane Cook), released in October 2007, the world premiere of Is He Dead?, a hitherto unproduced Mark Twain play that opened at Broadway's Lyceum Theatre on December 9, 2007, and Fifty Words Off-Broadway with Elizebeth Marvel at the Lucille Lortel Theatre (2008). In January 2008, he appeared as Captain Richard King in the miniseries adaptation of the Lonesome Dove prequel, Comanche Moon.

Starting December 23, 2008, Butz stepped in to replace Jeremy Piven in David Mamet's Speed-the-Plow; Piven suddenly and unexpectedly dropped out of the play after he experienced health problems. 
Butz took over the part until January 13, 2009, when William H. Macy assumed the role for the remainder of the play's run.

Butz taught at Drew University in Madison, New Jersey, for the spring semester in 2008 in the drama department.

He starred as Rowdy Kaiser in the ABC show The Deep End.

From April to May 9, 2010, he returned to the Broadway stage in ENRON as Jeffrey Skilling. Despite Tony nominations, the play struggled with ticket sales.

Butz starred in the 2011 drama indie film Higher Ground with Vera Farmiga, who also directed it.

Butz originated the role of Carl Hanratty in the musical Catch Me If You Can which played pre-Broadway tryouts at the 5th Avenue Theatre in Seattle, Washington, from July 28 through August 14, 2009. Butz played the role of Carl Hanratty in the Broadway production of Catch Me if You Can, which opened on April 10, 2011, and closed in September 2011. For this role he won his second Drama Desk Award for Outstanding Actor in a Musical and his second Tony Award for Best Actor in a Musical.

In April 2012, Butz appeared as himself in one episode of the NBC musical drama Smash. Butz played Hal Wilner in Greetings from Tim Buckley, a film on Tim and Jeff Buckley, which premiered at the 2012 Toronto International Film Festival.

From November 29, 2012 to January 6, 2013, Butz appeared on Broadway in Theresa Rebeck's Dead Accounts, opposite Katie Holmes, Jayne Houdyshell, Josh Hamilton, and Judy Greer.

In 2013 he starred in the new Andrew Lippa musical Big Fish, which premiered in Chicago in the spring and opened on Broadway in the Neil Simon Theatre in October, directed by Susan Stroman.

In 2012, he played Uncle Peck in a limited engagement revival of Paula Vogel's play How I Learned to Drive. He also starred in the 2013 film Better Living Through Chemistry. He played Kevin Rayburn in the 2015 Netflix television show Bloodline.

He also starred in the 2018 Broadway revival of My Fair Lady as Alfred Doolittle, the father of the leading role, Eliza Doolittle. He earned a nomination for Tony Award for Best Featured Actor in a Musical for the production.

From July 9–28, 2019, he appeared in an original musical collaboration titled TWOHANDER at Feinstein's/54 Below alongside Sherie Rene Scott, with musical director Todd Almond. Butz previously shared the stage with Scott in the original productions of the musicals Dirty Rotten Scoundrels and The Last Five Years.

In 2021, Butz played the role of Craig Maddox in the NBC drama series Debris which is written by J. H. Wyman.

Filmography

Film

Television

Theatre

Awards and nominations

Discography
 Memory and Mayhem: Live at 54 Below (2013)
 The Angel Band Project: An Evening With Norbert Leo Butz (2014)
 Girls Girls Girls: Live at 54 Below (2016)
The Long Haul (2019)

References

External links
 
 
 
 
 TonyAwards.com Interview with Norbert Leo Butz
 Downstage Center interview at American Theatre Wing, January 2008

1967 births
Living people
20th-century American male actors
21st-century American male actors
American male film actors
American male musical theatre actors
American male television actors
American male voice actors
Drama Desk Award winners
Male actors from St. Louis
Tony Award winners
Webster University alumni